The 2015–16 Nemzeti Bajnokság III was Hungary's third-level football competition. The championship was won by Ferencvárosi TC II, Kozármisleny SE, and Nyíregyháza Spartacus FC. However, Ferencvárosi TC II could not promote to the 2016–17 Nemzeti Bajnokság II since reserve teams can only play in the Nemzeti Bajnokság III. Therefore, the second best team, Mosonmagyaróvári TE were promoted to the Nemzeti Bajnokság II.

Standings

West

Centre

East

See also
 2015–16 Magyar Kupa
 2015–16 Nemzeti Bajnokság I
 2015–16 Nemzeti Bajnokság II

References

External links
  
  

Nemzeti Bajnokság III seasons
2015–16 in Hungarian football
Hun